Giovanni Gualberto Bottarelli wrote the libretto for several operas to which Johann Christian Bach wrote the music, and adapted many other operas. The first collaboration with Bach was Orione, performed at the King's Theatre (now Her Majesty's Theatre) in Haymarket to great acclaim in February 1763. Zanaida, a three-act opera debuted in London in May 1763, but was less well received. Other works were "Addio di Londra",  "Carattaco", "Cesare e Cleopatra", "Il Cid ", "L'Endimione", and "Rodelinda regina de' Longobardi".

Il ré pastore (The royal shepherd), adapted by Bottarelli, was printed in London in 1765.

Bottarelli was a witness in a court case against Casanova, who reported of him "Botarelli publishes in a pamphlet all the ceremonies of the Freemasons, and the only sentence passed on him is: 'He is a scoundrel. We knew that before!'" Casanova also calls Bottarelli a rascal, after meeting him and his family in penury, and  reports that Bottarelli had been a monk in his native city, Pisa, and had fled to England with his wife, who had been a nun.

References

Italian opera librettists
18th-century Italian writers
18th-century Italian male writers
Year of birth missing
Year of death missing